The Kenai National Wildlife Refuge is a  wildlife habitat preserve located on the Kenai Peninsula of Alaska, United States. It is adjacent to Kenai Fjords National Park. This refuge was created in 1941 as the Kenai National Moose Range, but in 1980 it was changed to its present status by the Alaska National Interest Lands Conservation Act. The refuge is administered from offices in Soldotna.

Terrain, Flora, and Fauna 
There is a wide variety of terrain in the refuge, including muskeg and other wetlands, alpine areas, and taiga forest.  The refuge protects several large mammals, including wolf packs, brown bears, black bears, dall sheep, moose, Canadian lynx, and caribou, as well as thousands of migratory and native birds. There are numerous lakes, including two very large lakes, Skilak Lake and Tustumena Lake as well as the Kenai River, and the refuge is a popular destination for fishing for salmon and trout.

Activities

Boating and Camping 
The refuge has several campgrounds and boat launches, including two developed campgrounds, one at Hidden Lake and another at Skilak Lake, both accessible from Skilak Lake Loop Road, which intersects the Sterling Highway at both ends. Other less-developed campgrounds and campsites are accessible from the Sterling Highway, Skilak Loop Road, Swanson River Road, and Swan Lake Road, the later of which do not require fees to access. Since 2005 the refuge has offered 16 cabins for public use via a reservation system, with some cabins accessible only via boat.

Canoe trails 
The Kenai National Wildlife Refuge has multiple small canoe systems linking lakes or groups of lakes. It further possess two larger canoe trails, which link large networks of lakes and rivers, often via portages. The most popular, the Swan Lake Canoe Trail, travels 60 miles, beginning at Canoe Lake (the west entrance), and terminates alternatively at Portage Lake (the east entrance) or the confluence of the Moose and Kenai rivers in Sterling. The longest, the Swanson River Canoe Route, spanning 80 miles, begins either at Paddle Lake or Gene Lake, and ends where the Swanson River meets the Cook Inlet at Captain Cook State Park.

Hiking 
There are over 110 miles of hiking trails in the refuge, accessed from the Sterling Highway, Skilak Lake Loop Road, Swanson River Road, various campgrounds, and the refuge visitor center and headquarters. These hikes range from difficult, multi-day back-country hikes to easier, short paved-trail walks.

Hunting 
As with most national wildlife refuges, the Kenai National Wildlife Refuge is open to hunting with certain restrictions, in particular in the area of Skilak Lake Road.

Wildfires
Naturally occurring wildfires are seen as beneficial in the long run for boreal forests, and so many areas of the Refuge are classified as limited suppression areas and firs may be allowed to burn unchecked so long as they do not move toward populated areas or Refuge facilities. In any given year there is a high likelihood of several small fires burning within the refuge. 

The Funny River Fire, a human-caused fire that began on May 19, 2014, had burned largely in the Kenai National Wildlife Refuge. During firefighting activities, a wolf den was damaged by a bulldozer and 5 pups (3 males and 2 females) were rescued by firefighters. The pups were taken to the Alaska Zoo and were later transferred to the Minnesota Zoo.

In 2019, lightning again ignited a major wildfire, named the Swan Lake Fire, and again it was allowed to burn unchecked for some time, until it began to threaten the communities of Sterling and Cooper Landing, as well the Sterling Highway and the Refuge's Skilak Lake Road, the only roads allowing access to towns on the lower Kenai Peninsula. In total  were burned before it was contained, but no structures were destroyed and there were no deaths.

Gallery

References

External links

 Official Site
 

1941 establishments in Alaska
ANILCA establishments
National Wildlife Refuges in Alaska
Protected areas of Kenai Peninsula Borough, Alaska
Wetlands of Alaska
Landforms of Kenai Peninsula Borough, Alaska